Consumed is the second studio album by Final Cut, released in 1992 by I.R.S. Records.

Reception

AllMusic awarded Consumed three out of five stars and said it "steps neatly into the cold-wave style that many other Nettwerk-distributed bands were practicing at the same time, most notably Front 242 and Manufacture."

Track listing

Personnel
Adapted from the Consumed liner notes.

Final Cut
 Joseph Lafata – keyboards, drums, percussion, backing vocals, arrangements, production, mixing
 Anthony Srock – vocals, keyboards, drum programming, arrangements, production, engineering, mixing
 William Tucker – guitar, noises, co-producer, mixing

Additional performers
 Chris Connelly – vocals and backing vocals (3, 8, 10)
 Hobie Echlin – bass guitar (5, 7)
 John Garstecki – keyboards (2, 6, 10)
 Ryan Moore – vocals (4, 8, 9)
 Michael Segal – guitar (5)
 Dave Straughter – vocals (9)
 Dennis White – guitar (7, 9), bass guitar (7)

Production and design
 Tom Baker – mastering
 Mike E. Clark – engineering, assistant programming (3, 6, 7)
 David Feeny – engineering
 George Maniatis – co-producer, mixing
 John Rummen – photography, design
 Shawn Stubbs – assistant engineering
 Jessica Villines – assistant engineering

Release history

References

External links 
 
 Consumed at iTunes

1992 albums
I.R.S. Records albums
Final Cut (band) albums